The black antshrike (Thamnophilus nigriceps) is a species of insectivorous bird in the antbird family Thamnophilidae. It is found in Colombia and Panama. Its natural habitats are subtropical or tropical moist lowland forests and heavily degraded former forest.

The black antshrike was described by the English zoologist Philip Sclater in 1869 and given its current binomial name Thamnophilus nigriceps.

References

black antshrike
Birds of Colombia
Birds of Panama
black antshrike
black antshrike
Taxonomy articles created by Polbot